Luis Alberio Cortés Rendón (2 February 1952 – 12 May 2022) was a Colombian Roman Catholic prelate.

Cortès Rendón was born in Quimbaya, Quindío, Colombia. He served as bishop of the Roman Catholic Diocese of Vélez, Colombia, from 2003 to 2015. He then served as titular bishop of Fidoloma and auxiliary bishop of the Roman Catholic Diocese of Pereira Colombia from 2015 until his death.

References

1952 births
2022 deaths
Colombian Roman Catholic bishops
Bishops appointed by Pope John Paul II
Bishops appointed by Pope Benedict XVI
People from Quindío Department